= National Assessment Group =

The National Assessment Group (NAG) operated as an entity within the United States Department of Defense. Its primary role involved offering engineering, technical, and assessment assistance to both the Department of Defense (DoD) and other governmental bodies. NAG's clientele encompasses various entities such as the Office of the Secretary of Defense, Combatant Commands (CCMDs), Joint organizations, individual Services, and additional federal government agencies.

NAG's primary function was to deliver impartial assessment services to support time-sensitive programmatic decisions. These assessments span a wide array of domains and systems. Each assessment is meticulously customized to align with the unique requirements of the respective clients. NAG frequently conducts rapid, independent evaluations to explore, showcase, and gauge the capabilities, technical attributes, potential threats, and vulnerabilities of systems.

The scope of systems that were under assessment by NAG is extensive, encompassing those in early developmental stages to those poised for operational deployment. The National Assessment Group operated out of Kirtland Air Force Base in New Mexico. The NAG is no longer located on Kirtland Air Force Base, and the Kirtland Website no longer lists the National Assessment Group as a tenent unit. The facility formerly used by the NAG is occupied by the Defense Threat Reduction Agency.
